Ami Shubhash Bolchi is a 2011 Bengali-language Indian film directed by Mahesh Manjrekar, starring Mithun Chakraborty, Saheb Bhattacharya, Laboni Sarkar, Karan Aanand, Barkha Bisht Sengupta and Anindya Banerjee. Mithun said of the film: "I have done nearly 350 films and this is my boldest film, ever". This movie is the Bengali version of Manjrekar's earlier original Marathi film along the same lines called Me Shivajiraje Bhosale Boltoy.

Plot
Ami Shubhash Bolchi is the story Netaji Subhas Chandra Bose who comes into the life of struggling Debabrata (Mithun) and through him, Netaji helps to awaken the Bengalis from "sleep" and acts as a super hero.

Summary
Debabrata Bose happens to be a laid back 'typical middle class Bengali' who tries to change himself after repeated insults by various people in various forms. He also finds that, the Bengalis are bending backwards to please people of other communities and many Bengalis are deep rooted in large corruption. Now enter the greatest Bengali patriot ever, our 'Netaji', who cannot keep quiet seeing all these, rises from immortality and makes a comeback to help Debabrata to rejuvenate and motivate the Bengalis. He helps Debabrata to stand up to voice against, particularly a non-Bengali promoter who plans to get hold of Debabrata's plot by kidnapping him and his family, but Debabrata manages to teach him a lesson with the help of invisible 'INA' sword given to him by Netaji.

Cast 
Mithun Chakraborty as Debabrata Bose
Saheb Bhattacharya as Rahul Bose, Debabrata's son
Laboni Sarkar as Sumitra Bose, Debabrata's wife
Barkha Bisht Sengupta as Charulata Bose, Debabrata's daughter
Bharat Kaul as Ramniklal Gosalia, the real estate king
Siddharth Jadhav as Usman Mondal
Anindya Banerjee as Netaji Subhash Chandra Bose
Abhijit Lahiri as Chandramohan Laha
Vineet Kumar Singh as Dubey (neighbour taxi driver)
Karan Anand as Karan
Mahesh Manjrekar as Chhatrapati Shivaji Maharaj (cameo)
Bharat Ganeshpure as Doctor

Reception

The movie was critically acclaimed by the critics. Mithun Chakroborty's performance was praised by all. The film went on to be an average grosser in box office.

References

External links 
 http://www.balconybeats.com/index.php/film-preview/ami-shubhash-bolchi-sounds-interesting/

2011 films
Films set in Kolkata
Bengali remakes of Marathi films
Films directed by Mahesh Manjrekar
Films about Subhas Chandra Bose
Bengali-language Indian films
2010s Bengali-language films